State Route 589 (SR 589) is a north–south state highway in the western part of the U.S. state of Ohio. SR 589's southern terminus is at SR 55 in the village of Casstown.

Route description
SR 589 runs through northeastern Miami County and southeastern Shelby County along its way.  No part of SR 589 is included as a part of the National Highway System, a system of routes considered to be most important for the economy, mobility and defense of the nation.

History
When it was designated in 1937, SR 589 appeared only along its current northern segment between US 36 east of Fletcher and its current northern terminus at what was then designated SR 54 (now SR 29).  One year later, SR 589 was extended westerly from its previous southern terminus along US 36 to Fletcher, then south to its current southern terminus at SR 55 in Casstown.

Major intersections

References

589
Transportation in Miami County, Ohio
Transportation in Shelby County, Ohio